Shawntae Harris-Dupart (born April 14, 1974), better known by her stage name Da Brat, is an American rapper. Born and raised in Chicago, Illinois, she began her career in 1992, the year she signed with So So Def Records. Her debut album Funkdafied (1994) sold one million copies, making her the first female solo rap act to receive a platinum certification, and the second overall female rap act (solo or group) after Salt-N-Pepa.

Throughout her career, she has earned two top ten hits on the Billboard Hot 100, "Funkdafied" and "Not Tonight", the latter with Lil' Kim, Lisa Lopes, Missy Elliott and Angie Martinez. Brat has also had commercial success with other songs including "I Think They Like Me", plus several remixes of Mariah Carey's songs, including "Loverboy", "Always Be My Baby", "I Still Believe/Pure Imagination", "Honey", and "Gotta Thing For You", a hip-hop-inspired version of the Bobby Caldwell song "What You Won’t Do For Love". Brat has received two Grammy Award nominations.

Early life and education
Da Brat was born on April 14, 1974, in Chicago, Illinois, and was raised primarily in the West Side district of the city. Her father is David Ray McCoy, a businessman, and mother, Nadine Brewer, a city bus driver. Her parents never married. Brat was subsequently raised in two different households. Da Brat lived part of the time with her mother and grandmother and attended an Apostolic church four times a week, where she sang in the choir. She is the paternal half-sister of LisaRaye McCoy. Da Brat attended Kenwood Academy during her sophomore and junior year, where she ran track and played basketball. She graduated from the Academy of Scholastic Achievement, a continuation charter school that caters to at-risk students in 1992.

Career

1992–1995: Early success
In 1992, Da Brat's big break occurred when she won the grand prize in a local rap contest sponsored by Yo! MTV Raps. For the prize, she met the young rap duo Kris Kross. They introduced her to their producer, Jermaine Dupri, who signed her to his So So Def label. Da Brat's debut album Funkdafied was released in 1994 and entered the rap albums chart at number 11. The album went platinum, making her the first female solo rapper to sell one million copies. The single "Funkdafied" reached number 1 on the rap singles chart and number 6 on the Billboard Hot 100. Her follow-up single from the same album, "Give It 2 You," reached number 26 on the Hot 100.

1996–1999: Collaborations and film projects
In 1996, Da Brat released her second full-length album, Anuthatantrum, which included the single "Ghetto Love" featuring T-Boz of TLC. During the rest of the 1990s, Da Brat came to be known more for her "featured" appearances on other rappers' and R&B singers' albums rather than for her own solo work. Da Brat was also featured with Kris Kross on the title track of their album Da Bomb (1993) as well as on their third album Young, Rich and Dangerous (1996). She contributed a rhyme to the hip hop remix of Mariah Carey's hit, "Always Be My Baby" (1996).  She also made her feature film debut that year in Kazaam (1996) with Shaquille O'Neal. In 1997 she and Dupri appeared on the remix of the Dru Hill hit "In My Bed". That same year, Da Brat appeared along with Dupri on a remix of Carey's "Honey (So So Def mix)" (1997) and recorded the hit remix of "Ladies' Night (Not Tonight)" (1997) with Lil' Kim, Left-Eye of TLC, Angie Martinez, and Missy Elliott. Also in 1997, she was featured on "Sock It 2 Me," a track on Missy Elliott's debut album, Supa Dupa Fly. In 1999, she appeared, alongside Krayzie Bone, on the remix to Mariah Carey's cover of Brenda K. Starr's "I Still Believe" (1998). She also appeared as a guest artist with Elliott on Carey's remix of "Heartbreaker" (1999), and on the remix of Brandy's "U Don't Know Me (Like U Used To)." That year, she was also featured on a remix of the Destiny's Child single "Jumpin', Jumpin'" (1999).

2000–2003: Return to solo work
In early 2000, Da Brat released her third full-length album Unrestricted, which produced the moderately successful singles "That's What I'm Looking For" (U.S. number 56) and "What'chu Like" (U.S. number 26), featuring soul singer, Tyrese. The album was not well-received compared to Brat's earlier work. However, the new album and new millennium did inspire an image makeover for Da Brat. Abandoning her "gangsta" persona, she decided to follow the trend in popular music and attempted to add to her sex appeal. In 2001, Brat continued her trend of being featured on other artist's remixes, reaching number 1 on the Billboard Hot R&B/Hip Hop Singles chart along with rapper Ludacris on the main remix of Mariah Carey's "Loverboy" and being featured artist on Destiny's Child's "Survivor" remix. Da Brat also appeared as Louise in Carey's 2001 movie Glitter. In 2003, Brat released her fourth album, titled Limelite, Luv & Niteclubz, including the single In Love wit Chu which peaked at peaked at n°9 on the Billboard rhythmic. In the same time, she appeared on the fourth season of VH1's The Surreal Life.

2005–present: Current activities
In 2005, she made a comeback of sorts when she was featured on the remix of the song "I Think They Like Me," by Dem Franchize Boyz, which also featured Bow Wow and Jermaine Dupri. The song peaked at No. 1 on the Billboard Hot R&B/Hip Hop Singles chart and No. 15 on the Billboard Hot 100. In 2006, she was an onstage guest on Mariah Carey's The Adventures of Mimi Tour in Atlanta, New York City, Long Island, Washington, DC, Chicago, and Los Angeles performing her rap verses on the "Heartbreaker" and "Honey" remixes. She was also featured on Kelly Rowland's "Gotsta Go," a bonus track from her 2007 album Ms. Kelly and is also featured on "4real4real", a bonus track from Carey's E=MC². She also co-wrote a song with Carey called "O.O.C." which appears on E=MC² and contributes backing vocals on the track. In 2007, she participated in the fifth season of the VH1 reality series Celebrity Fit Club. In 2011, she did a remix with Kelly Rowland called "Motivation" featuring Lil Wayne. Following her release from prison, she launched a web series about life after the experience titled "Brat Chronicles: In Transition" on YouTube. She released her new single "Is It Chu?" on iTunes and other digital services on July 2, 2013. She now works for the Rickey Smiley Morning show as a co-host (July 2015 – present) and is part of the Dish Nation cast out of Atlanta. Since 2016, Da Brat has appeared on the reality TV series The Rap Game, as a mentor to young talent. In 2017 Da Brat joined the reality TV series Growing up Hip Hop: Atlanta which follows around Atlanta legends and children of Atlanta legends.

Personal life
Da Brat dated Allen Iverson in the late 1990s. In an interview with Variety in March 2020, she discussed coming out as a lesbian  and why it took her 25 years to do so. On March 26, 2020, Da Brat confirmed that she is in a relationship with hair product mogul Jesseca Dupart.  On February 22, 2022, Da Brat and Dupart married in Georgia.

Da Brat announced in February 2023 that she and Harris-Dupart are growing their family and that she is expecting her first child. She had surgery to remove fibroids and polyps prior to an embryo transfer procedure and suffered a miscarriage before the current pregnancy.

Legal troubles and 2008 prison sentence
In 2001, Da Brat pleaded guilty to misdemeanor reckless conduct after she had battered a woman with a gun during a dispute over VIP seating in an Atlanta nightclub in 2000. The victim in that incident received six stitches for a head wound. Da Brat ended up serving a year's probation, performed 80 hours of community service, and paid a $1,000 fine. On October 31, 2007, Da Brat was involved in an altercation that ended in assault at a Halloween party held at Studio 72 nightclub near Atlanta. Da Brat initially argued with a hostess, and when the hostess walked away to talk to her manager, Da Brat attacked her from behind, striking her in the face with a rum bottle. The waitress was rushed to an area hospital, and police arrested and jailed Da Brat.  In court, Da Brat pleaded guilty to aggravated assault charges. She was sentenced to three years in prison, seven years of probation, 200 hours of community service. In May 2010, she was temporarily released from prison as part of a work-release program, after serving 21 months. On February 28, 2011,  Da Brat was released from prison, according to her boss Jermaine Dupri. Her civil trial stemming from the 2007 altercation commenced on February 24, 2014. On February 28, 2014, a civil trial jury awarded ex-NFL cheerleader Shayla Stevens, the assault victim, $6.4 million to cover her injuries and past/future loss of earnings.

Discography

Studio albums 
 Funkdafied (1994)
 Anuthatantrum (1996)
 Unrestricted (2000)
 Limelite, Luv & Niteclubz (2003)

Tours
Joint tour
 Rainbow World Tour (with Mariah Carey and Missy Elliott) (2000)

Filmography

Film

Television

Awards and nominations

Grammy Awards

Soul Train Lady of Soul Awards

BET Awards

Billboard Awards

References

Further reading

External links
 
 

1974 births
Living people
20th-century American actresses
20th-century American singers
21st-century American actresses
21st-century American singers
Actresses from Chicago
African-American actresses
African-American women rappers
American women rappers
American film actresses
American people convicted of assault
American television actresses
Lesbian actresses
Lesbian musicians
LGBT rappers
LGBT African Americans
LGBT people from Illinois
American LGBT singers
Midwest hip hop musicians
Participants in American reality television series
Prisoners and detainees of Georgia (U.S. state)
Rappers from Chicago
So So Def Recordings artists
20th-century American women singers
21st-century American rappers
21st-century American women singers
20th-century American LGBT people
21st-century American LGBT people
20th-century African-American women singers
21st-century African-American women singers
21st-century women rappers